On July 1, 1987, President Ronald Reagan nominated Judge Robert Bork for Associate Justice of the Supreme Court of the United States, to succeed Lewis F. Powell Jr., who had earlier announced his retirement. At the time of his nomination, Bork was a judge on the United States Court of Appeals for the District of Columbia Circuit, a position to which he had been appointed by President Reagan in 1982.

Bork's nomination precipitated contentious debate. Opposition to his nomination centered on his perceived willingness to roll back the civil rights rulings of the Warren and Burger courts, and his role in the Saturday Night Massacre during the Watergate scandal.  On October 23, 1987, the United States Senate rejected Robert Bork's nomination to the Supreme Court by a roll-call vote of 42–58. This is the most recent Supreme Court nomination to be rejected by vote of the Senate.

Reagan subsequently announced his intention to nominate Douglas H. Ginsburg to succeed Powell, but Ginsburg withdrew from consideration following revelations of his earlier marijuana use. Instead, Reagan nominated Anthony Kennedy, who was viewed as a mainstream conservative Republican. Kennedy was unanimously confirmed in February 1988.

Nomination
United States Supreme Court Associate Justice Lewis F. Powell Jr., was considered a conservative/moderate, but often referred to as the "swing vote" in close decisions at the time. After he announced his retirement on June 26, 1987, Senate Democrats asked liberal leaders to form a "solid phalanx" to oppose an "ideological extremist" replacement for Powell. Democrats warned Reagan there would be a fight over the nomination if Bork became the nominee.

President Reagan nominated Bork for Powell's seat on July 1, 1987. Bork had long been interested in the position; President Richard Nixon promised him the next seat on the Supreme Court, following Bork's compliance in firing Special Prosecutor Archibald Cox during the controversial "Saturday Night Massacre" of October 1973. Nixon was unable to carry out the promise before his resignation on August 9, 1974. When the next Supreme Court vacancy occurred under President Gerald Ford, due to the retirement of William O. Douglas in 1975, civil rights groups expressed deep opposition to Bork being nominated, and Douglas' seat went to John Paul Stevens. Bork was also a finalist to be nominated in 1986 after Reagan nominated then-Associate Justice William Rehnquist to be Chief Justice of the United States after the resignation of Warren Burger, but Reagan nominated Antonin Scalia for Rehnquist's associate justice seat.

Response to the nomination
Within 45 minutes of Bork's nomination to the Court, Senator Ted Kennedy (D-MA) took to the Senate floor with a strong condemnation of Bork in a nationally televised speech, declaring:

Bork responded, "There was not a line in that speech that was accurate." In 1988, an analysis published in the Western Political Quarterly of amicus curiae briefs filed by U.S. Solicitors General during the Warren and Burger Courts found that during Bork's tenure in the position during the Nixon and Ford Administrations (1973–1977), Bork took liberal positions in the aggregate as often as Thurgood Marshall did during the Johnson Administration (1965–1967), and more often than Wade H. McCree did during the Carter Administration (1977–1981), in part because Bork filed briefs in favor of the litigants in civil rights cases 75 percent of the time (contradicting a previous review of his civil rights record published in 1983).

On July 5, 1987, NAACP executive director Benjamin Hooks described their position on the Bork nomination: "We will fight it all the way – until hell freezes over, and then we'll skate across on the ice." A brief was prepared for Joe Biden, head of the Senate Judiciary Committee, called the Biden Report. Bork later said in his book The Tempting of America that the report "so thoroughly misrepresented a plain record that it easily qualifies as world class in the category of scurrility". TV ads produced by People For the American Way, and narrated by Gregory Peck, attacked Bork as an extremist. Along with Kennedy's speech, these ads successfully fueled widespread public skepticism of Bork's nomination. The rapid response of Kennedy's "Robert Bork's America" speech stunned the Reagan White House; though conservatives considered Kennedy's accusations slanderous, the attacks went unanswered for two and a half months.

Judiciary Committee review

Confirmation hearings
A heated debate over Bork's nomination ensued, partly fueled by strong opposition by civil and women's rights groups concerned with Bork's perceived willingness to roll back civil rights rulings of the Warren and Burger courts, and his opposition to the federal government's right to impose standards of voting fairness upon the states.

Bork is one of only four Supreme Court nominees to ever be opposed by the ACLU, along with William Rehnquist, Samuel Alito, and Brett Kavanaugh. Bork was also criticized for being an "advocate of disproportionate powers for the executive branch of Government, almost executive supremacy", particularly the notion of the President of the United States having unrestrained authority, especially unitary executive theory, as demonstrated by his role in the "Saturday Night Massacre" when he fired the then-United States Special Prosecutor, Archibald Cox during Richard Nixon's Watergate scandal to protect Nixon from being investigated in the Watergate scandal. Bork's firing of Cox was ruled illegal in Nader v. Bork, by the United States District Court for the District of Columbia soon afterwards.

During debate over his nomination, Bork's video rental history was leaked to the press, which led to the enactment of the 1988 Video Privacy Protection Act as a response. The leak was inspired by Bork's opposition to privacy protections beyond those explicitly outlined in the constitution. His video rental history was unremarkable and included such harmless titles as A Day at the Races, Ruthless People, and The Man Who Knew Too Much. The list of rentals was gathered and published by writer Michael Dolan, who worked for Washington, D. C.'s, City Paper.

To pro-choice legal groups, Bork's originalist views, and his belief that the Constitution does not protect a "right to privacy" were viewed as a clear signal that, should he become a justice of the Supreme Court, he would vote to completely overrule the Supreme Court's 1973 decision Roe v. Wade. These groups also claimed that Bork's marriage to Mary Ellen Pohl, a former Roman Catholic nun and anti-abortion supporter would allow her to influence his decisions on the abortion issue. Bork himself became a Catholic in July 2003. Accordingly, a large number of left-wing groups mobilized to press for Bork's rejection, and his confirmation hearings became an intensely partisan battle. Bork was faulted for his bluntness before the committee, including his criticism of the reasoning underlying Roe v. Wade. Simultaneously, however, his supporters expressed frustration that some of Bork's most controversial and conservative views, including those on the scope of the First Amendment and the Equal Protection clause of the Fourteenth Amendment, as expressed in his writings and past opinions, had been suddenly moderated for his testimony before the committee.

As Chairman of the Judiciary Committee, Senator Joe Biden presided over Bork's hearing. Biden stated his opposition to Bork soon after the nomination, reversing an approval in an interview of a hypothetical Bork nomination he had made the previous year and angering conservatives who thought he could not conduct the hearings dispassionately. At the close of the hearings, Biden won praise for conducting the proceedings fairly and with good humor and courage, as his 1988 presidential campaign collapsed in the middle of the hearings. Rejecting some of the arguments that other Bork opponents were making, Biden framed his discussion around the belief that the Constitution provides rights to liberty and privacy that extend beyond those explicitly enumerated in the text, and that Bork's strong originalism was ideologically incompatible with that view.

Committee vote
On October 6, the Senate Judiciary Committee held two votes on the Bork nomination. The committee first voted on a motion to send the nomination to the floor with a favorable recommendation, which was defeated 5–9. It next voted on a motion to send the nomination to the floor with an unfavorable recommendation, which passed 9–5. Republican Arlen Specter voted with the Democratic majority on both votes.

Following the decisive vote, Bork's political support in the Senate quickly eroded, making the nomination's ultimate defeat all but certain, and it was widely expected that he would withdraw his name from further consideration. Nonetheless, on October 9, Bork announced his belief that:

Full Senate vote

On October 23, 1987, the Senate rejected Robert Bork's nomination to the Supreme Court by a vote of 58–42. Altogether, two Democrats and 40 Republicans voted in favor of confirmation, whereas 52 Democrats and six Republicans voted against.

Impact

The following month, President Reagan nominated Judge Anthony Kennedy for the position on the Court (after the name of a second nominee, Douglas H. Ginsburg, was withdrawn). He was subsequently confirmed by the Senate by a 97–0 vote.

The October 1987 Bork confirmation vote was one of the most controversial votes on a Supreme Court nominee in its history. Unhappy with his treatment during the nomination process, Bork resigned his appellate court judgeship the following year.

In 2011, New York Times columnist Joe Nocera claimed that "[t]he Bork fight, in some ways, was the beginning of the end of civil discourse in politics. The anger between Democrats and Republicans, the unwillingness to work together, the profound mistrust – the line from Bork to today's ugly politics is a straight one." Nocera cited Democratic activist Ann Lewis, who wrote that if Bork's nomination "were carried out as an internal Senate debate, we would have deep and thoughtful discussions about the Constitution, and then we would lose."

Political scientist Scott Lemieux, writing in The American Prospect, disputes the view of Bork as a victim of "allegedly unfair treatment ... [leading] to a new area of political incivility," arguing that Bork's originalism was "for the most part intellectually shallow and politically motivated." Arguing that all of Kennedy's harsh charges were grounded in Bork's published legal opinions, he wrote that there was "no reason for Democrats to abjure accurate statements merely because they're put in stark enough terms to be politically effective."

Decades later, the failure of Bork's nomination is seen through a deeply partisan lens, perceived as both a watershed moment for partisanship in judicial nominations, and as a risky ideological gambit by the Reagan administration:

"Bork" as a verb
William Safire of The New York Times attributes "possibly" the first use of bork as a verb to The Atlanta Journal-Constitution of August 20, 1987. In fact, the word had appeared a few days earlier, in a newspaper opinion piece dated August 11. Safire defines "to bork" by reference "to the way Democrats savaged Ronald Reagan's nominee, the Appeals Court judge Robert H. Bork, the year before". This definition stems from the history of the fight over Bork's nomination. Bork was widely lauded for his competence, but reviled for his political philosophy. In March 2002, the word was added to the Oxford English Dictionary under "bork"; its definition extends beyond judicial nominees, stating that people who bork others "usually [do so] with the aim of preventing [a person's] appointment to public office".

Perhaps the best known use of the verb to bork occurred in July 1991 at a conference of the National Organization for Women in New York City. Feminist Florynce Kennedy addressed the conference on the importance of defeating the nomination of Clarence Thomas to the U.S. Supreme Court. She said: "We're going to bork him. We're going to kill him politically ... This little creep, where did he come from?" However, Thomas was subsequently confirmed after a contentious confirmation hearing.

References

Further reading

External links
 Bork Confirmation Hearing on C-SPAN

100th United States Congress
Nominations to the United States Supreme Court
Presidency of Ronald Reagan
Reagan administration controversies